Hugo Miguel da Silva Passos, ComIH  (born September 27, 1979, in Lisbon) is an amateur Portuguese Greco-Roman wrestler, who competed in the men's lightweight category. He won four gold medals in his respective category at the Deaflympics (2001, 2005, 2009 and 2013), and set a historic milestone as the first legally deaf athlete to represent Portugal at the 2004 Summer Olympics. Despite having a hearing disability, Passos trained throughout his sporting career as a member of the wrestling team for Casa Pia Athletics Club with the assistance of his personal coach and 1996 Olympic wrestler David Maia.

Passos qualified as a lone wrestler for the Portuguese squad in the men's 60 kg class at the 2004 Summer Olympics in Athens. Earlier in the process, he finished twenty-eighth from the Olympic Qualification Tournament in Novi Sad, Serbia and Montenegro but managed to fill up an entry by the International Federation of Association Wrestling through a tripartite invitation. Passos lost his opening match to Romania's Eusebiu Diaconu on technical superiority, and was wretchedly pinned by U.S. wrestler and two-time Olympian Jim Gruenwald with only nineteen seconds left in time, leaving him on the bottom of the prelim pool and placing penultimate out of 22 wrestlers in the final standings.

References

External links
Profile – International Wrestling Database
Profile – Portuguese Paralympic Committee
Deaflympics Bio & Results

1979 births
Living people
Portuguese male sport wrestlers
Olympic wrestlers of Portugal
Wrestlers at the 2004 Summer Olympics
Sportspeople from Lisbon
Deaf martial artists
Portuguese deaf people
European Games competitors for Portugal
Wrestlers at the 2015 European Games